Bastilla missionarii is a moth of the family Noctuidae first described by Gustaaf Hulstaert in 1924. It is only known from the Tanimbar Islands in Indonesia.

References

External links
Holloway, J. D. & Miller, Scott E. (2003). "The composition, generic placement and host-plant relationships of the joviana-group in the Parallelia generic complex". Invertebrate Systematics. 17: 111–128.

Bastilla (moth)
Moths described in 1924